The 2016 Dally M Awards were presented on Wednesday 28 September 2016. They are the official annual awards of the National Rugby League and are named after Dally Messenger. Cooper Cronk and Jason Taumalolo became just the second joint winners of the Dally M Medal after both players tied with 26 votes apiece.

Judges
Judges are usually ex-players which have an involvement in that game such as commentary. Such judges in 2016 included Brad Fittler, Darren Lockyer and Braith Anasta

Dally M Medal

Dally M Awards
The Dally M Awards are, as usual, conducted at the close of the regular season and do not take games played in the finals series into account. The Dally M Medal is for the official player of the year while the Provan-Summons Medal is for the fans' of "people's favourite" player of the year.

Presenters

Pre-Dally M Presentation

Monday Night with Matty Johns crew

The following people are from Fox Sports (Australia)'s Monday Night With Matty Johns.  They performed their show 'live on the red carpet' instead of on their regular Monday night.

 Matthew Johns
 Nathan Hindmarsh
 Gorden Tallis
 Bryan Fletcher
 Jamie Rogers (from Sportsbet)
 Lara Pitt
 'Professor' James Rochford

On the red carpet interviews
Through Matty Johns' show, regular interviews occurred between the following presenters and a number of players arriving with their partners.

 Aaron Woods
 Kayla Boyd (Darius Boyd's wife).

Dally M Presentation

Hosts
The following Fox Sports presenters were the main hosts for the event.

 Tony Squires
 Lara Pitt

Countdown
The following Fox Sports presenters were the main presenters for the countdown. They gave a brief summary round by round from round 16-26 before announcing any points given to anyone in the top 10.

 Greg Alexander
 Matthew Johns

See also
Dally M Awards
Dally M Medal
2016 NRL season

References

Dally M Awards
Dally M Awards